Albert Thoroughgood Buick (17 January 1875 – 25 March 1948) was a Scottish footballer, who played for Arbroath, Heart of Midlothian and Portsmouth.

Born in Arbroath, Buick started his career with home-town Arbroath F.C., where he stayed until 1896. In July of that year he joined Hearts, answering an advertisement from the then reigning Scottish Cup holders. He appeared infrequently as Hearts won the 1896-97 League title but became a more regular player the following season. He played in Hearts 1900-01 Scottish Cup win, where the Edinburgh side defeated Celtic 4-3 in the final and was club captain by the time the side reached the 1902-03 final, where they lost to Rangers.

Buick's appearance led many commentators to consider him an unlikely defender. He measured only 5 foot 7 inches tall, had a slight stoop and his long, gangly arms earned him the nickname "spider". However, his all-action style and stamina earned him many admirers and two caps for the Scottish national team in March 1902. These came against Ireland and Wales and Buick scored in both games as Scotland won 5-1 on each occasion. The stature of his contemporary and rival for the centre-half position, Alex Raisbeck, was said to have ensured he didn't win more honours.

Buick moved south to Southern Football League side Portsmouth in 1903 and was eventually joined by six former Hearts teammates.  He spent eight season with Pompey, most notably helping the team to an upset victory over Manchester United in a 1906-07 FA Cup replay.

See also
List of Scotland national football team captains

References

External links

Incomplete appearances at londonhearts.com

1875 births
1948 deaths
Arbroath F.C. players
Association football central defenders
Heart of Midlothian F.C. players
Portsmouth F.C. players
Scotland international footballers
Scottish Football League players
Scottish Football League representative players
Scottish footballers
Southern Football League players
Place of death missing
People from Arbroath
Footballers from Angus, Scotland